Petrophile chrysantha is a species of flowering plant in the family Proteaceae and is endemic to southwestern Western Australia. It is a small shrub with crowded, sharply-pointed, pinnately-divided leaves, and oval heads of hairy, cream-coloured to dark yellow flowers.

Description

Taxonomy
Petrophile chrysantha was first formally described in 1855 by Carl Meissner in Hooker's Journal of Botany and Kew Garden Miscellany from material collected by James Drummond. The specific epithet (chrysantha) means "golden-flowered".

Distribution and habitat
This petrophile grows in shrubland and woodland between Regans Ford, Eneabba and Marchagee in the Geraldton Sandplains and Swan Coastal Plain biogeographic regions of southwestern Western Australia.

Conservation status
Petrophile chrysantha is classified as "not threatened" by the Western Australian Government Department of Parks and Wildlife.

References

chrysantha
Eudicots of Western Australia
Endemic flora of Western Australia
Plants described in 1855
Taxa named by Carl Meissner